673 Edda is a minor planet orbiting the Sun. It was discovered 20 September 1908 by the American astronomer Joel Hastings Metcalf, and was named for the Norse Edda literary works. The name may also have been inspired by the asteroid's provisional designation 1908 EA.

The long rotation period and low brightness amplitude of this asteroid make it more challenging for measurement of the rotation period. The unusual light curve suggests that the asteroid shape is very asymmetric.

References

External links
 
 

Background asteroids
Edda
Edda
S-type asteroids (Tholen)
S-type asteroids (SMASS)
19080920